Miscellaneous Symbols and Arrows is a Unicode block containing arrows and geometric shapes with various fills, astrological symbols, technical symbols, intonation marks, and others.

Block

Emoji
The Miscellaneous Symbols and Arrows block contains seven emoji:
U+2B05–U+2B07, U+2B1B–U+2B1C, U+2B50 and U+2B55.

The block has fourteen standardized variants defined to specify emoji-style (U+FE0F VS16) or text presentation (U+FE0E VS15) for the
seven emoji.

History
The following Unicode-related documents record the purpose and process of defining specific characters in the Miscellaneous Symbols and Arrows block:

See also
 Mathematical operators and symbols in Unicode

References

Unicode blocks
Unicode blocks with characters for games